Ancistrus kellerae is a relatively new species of nocturnal freshwater fish found in the Potaro River and its tributaries. It is a small sized Ancistrus ranging between 1 – 69 mm in body length, being widest right below the opercles and narrowing to the peduncle. Like other fish in the genus Ancistrus, A. kellerae has small papillate located on both the suckermouth and longer ones on the snouth.

References 

kellerae
Taxa named by Jonathan W. Armbruster
Fish described in 2019
Fish of Guyana